The West Parish Elementary School Science Park is an interactive community science park, one of the first in the US, that is located on the site of the West Parish Elementary School in Gloucester, Massachusetts, USA. It is used as an integral part of the school curriculum.

Planning and construction
The Fund-raising for this 125,000.00 USD Project was funded primarily by grants from the national science foundation and the Massachusetts Institute of Technology (MIT). Additionally the PTO rounded up many direct donations that made this park possible.

Construction of this park took place over a half-year period. The construction of the park was completed primarily by members of the school PTO with some help coming in from various groups.  Scientists, including professors at the MIT, were on hand to aid in the design of the project.

The project
The park was first used on the last day of school in 2005. The park contains:
 Surge Swings
 Spring Bridge
 The Air Lifter
 The Foam Lifter 
 Fish Runs
 Pulley Systems
 Organ Pipes

Notes

References

External links
 West Parish Elementary School site
Official District Website Of The Gloucester Public School System

Education in Massachusetts
Gloucester, Massachusetts
Parks in Essex County, Massachusetts